Emperor Shenwu may refer to:

Gao Huan (496–547), Eastern Wei regent and father of Northern Qi's founding emperor Gao Yang
Liu Chong (895–954), founding emperor of Northern Han
Li Jiqian (963–1004), Tangut leader and grandfather of Western Xia's founding emperor Li Yuanhao

See also
Emperor Shengwu (disambiguation)